This is a list of Zethus species.

Zethus adonis
Zethus aethiopicus
Zethus ajax
Zethus alacris
Zethus albopictus
Zethus albopilosus
Zethus alogus
Zethus alticola
Zethus alvarengai
Zethus amazonicus
Zethus analis
Zethus andesae
Zethus andinus
Zethus angustior
Zethus anisitsii
Zethus anomalus
Zethus apicalipennis
Zethus arabicus
Zethus arietis
Zethus arotus
Zethus ater
Zethus atripennis
Zethus attenuatus
Zethus aurantiacus
Zethus aurulens
Zethus aztecus
Zethus bahamensis
Zethus bakeri
Zethus bardus
Zethus bequaerti
Zethus bicolor
Zethus biglumis
Zethus bilaminatus
Zethus binghami
Zethus binodis
Zethus bodkini
Zethus boharti
Zethus bolivarensis
Zethus bolivianus
Zethus brasiliensis
Zethus brooksi
Zethus bryanti
Zethus buyssoni
Zethus campanulatus
Zethus campestris
Zethus caracis
Zethus carbonarius
Zethus caridei
Zethus carinatus
Zethus carpenteri
Zethus cavagnaroi
Zethus cavagneroi
Zethus celebensis
Zethus cerceroides
Zethus ceylonicus
Zethus chacoensis
Zethus chalybeus
Zethus chapadensis
Zethus charon
Zethus chicotencatl
Zethus chimorum
Zethus chrysopterus
Zethus cineraceus
Zethus cinerascens
Zethus claripennis
Zethus clavatus
Zethus clio
Zethus clypearis
Zethus clypeolaris
Zethus coeruleopennis
Zethus coloratus
Zethus columbiae
Zethus conicus
Zethus corallinus
Zethus corcovadensis
Zethus coriarius
Zethus corioicae
Zethus cristatus
Zethus cruzi
Zethus cubensis
Zethus curialis
Zethus cylindricus
Zethus delagoensis
Zethus demissus
Zethus dentostipes
Zethus dicomboda
Zethus didymogaster
Zethus diminutus
Zethus discoelioides
Zethus dodgei
Zethus dolosus
Zethus dreisbachi
Zethus dubius
Zethus duckei
Zethus ebenus
Zethus ecuadorae
Zethus emarginatus
Zethus empeyi
Zethus erythrogaster
Zethus erythrostomus
Zethus evansi
Zethus excavatus
Zethus fabricator
Zethus favilaceus
Zethus favillaceus
Zethus felix
Zethus fergusoni
Zethus flavidulus
Zethus flavipons
Zethus fluminensis
Zethus fortistriolatus
Zethus fraternus
Zethus frederickorum
Zethus fritzi
Zethus fulvohirtus
Zethus fuscus
Zethus garciai
Zethus gaudens
Zethus gigas
Zethus gonostylus
Zethus gracilis
Zethus guatemotzin
Zethus guerreroi
Zethus guineensis
Zethus haemorrhoidalis
Zethus hamatus
Zethus harlequinus
Zethus haywardi
Zethus hexagonus
Zethus heydeni
Zethus hilarianus
Zethus histrionicus
Zethus holmbergii
Zethus huascari
Zethus iheringi
Zethus imitator
Zethus imperfectus
Zethus improcerus
Zethus inca
Zethus incommodus
Zethus inconstans
Zethus indicus
Zethus indistictus
Zethus inermis
Zethus infelix
Zethus infundibuliformis
Zethus inornatus
Zethus irwini
Zethus islandicus
Zethus isthmicus
Zethus javanus
Zethus jurinei
Zethus laevinodus
Zethus lamellicornis
Zethus lignicola
Zethus lobulatus
Zethus longistylus
Zethus lopezi
Zethus luederwaldti
Zethus lunaris
Zethus lunaris cooperi
Zethus luzonensis
Zethus lynchi
Zethus madecassus
Zethus magnus
Zethus magretti
Zethus malabaricus
Zethus mandibularis
Zethus mapiriensis
Zethus matzicatzin
Zethus medius
Zethus melanis
Zethus menkei
Zethus mexicanus
Zethus micella
Zethus milleri
Zethus mimus
Zethus miniatus
Zethus minimus
Zethus miscogaster
Zethus missionus
Zethus mocsaryi
Zethus montezuma
Zethus mutatus
Zethus namibicus
Zethus neffi
Zethus neotomitus
Zethus nicaraguensis
Zethus niger
Zethus nigerrimus
Zethus nigricornis
Zethus nitidinodus
Zethus nodosus
Zethus notatus
Zethus nutans
Zethus oaxacae
Zethus obscurus
Zethus olmecus
Zethus orans
Zethus orizabae
Zethus otomitus
Zethus pallidus
Zethus pamparum
Zethus pampicola
Zethus paranensis
Zethus parkeri
Zethus parvulus
Zethus pavidus
Zethus peculiaris
Zethus permutatus
Zethus peruvianus
Zethus peruvicus
Zethus pilosus
Zethus pipiens
Zethus placidus
Zethus planiclypeus
Zethus plaumanni
Zethus poeyi
Zethus polybioides
Zethus porteri
Zethus precans
Zethus productus
Zethus prominens
Zethus pronatus
Zethus proximus
Zethus pseudozethus
Zethus pubescens
Zethus punctatus
Zethus punctinodis
Zethus pygmaeus
Zethus pyriformis
Zethus quadridentatus
Zethus restrepoicus
Zethus rhodesianus
Zethus rodhaini
Zethus romandinus
Zethus roridus
Zethus rossi
Zethus rothschildanus
Zethus rubellus
Zethus rubioi
Zethus rufinodus
Zethus rufipes
Zethus rufus
Zethus rugosiceps
Zethus satanicus
Zethus schadei
Zethus schlingeri
Zethus schrottkyanus
Zethus sculpturalis
Zethus senegalensis
Zethus sessilis
Zethus seyrigi
Zethus shannoni
Zethus sichelianus
Zethus silvaegrandis
Zethus silvestris
Zethus simillimus
Zethus simulans
Zethus slossonae
Zethus smidtianus
Zethus smithii
Zethus spegazzinii
Zethus spinipes
Zethus spiniventris
Zethus spinosus
Zethus stellaris
Zethus striatifrons
Zethus strigosus
Zethus subspinosus
Zethus sulcatus
Zethus thoracicus
Zethus toltecus
Zethus torquatus
Zethus trimaculatus
Zethus trispinosus
Zethus tuberculifer
Zethus umbrosus
Zethus varipunctatus
Zethus velezi
Zethus venezuelanus
Zethus ventricosus
Zethus vincenti
Zethus wagneri
Zethus waldoi
Zethus westwoodi
Zethus weyrauchi
Zethus wileyi
Zethus willinki
Zethus yarrowi
Zethus yepezi
Zethus yucatanae
Zethus yucatanensis
Zethus zendalus

 List of Zethus species